Hanley Child is a village in Worcestershire, England.

It is part of Hanley civil parish.

Hanley Child was in the upper division of Doddingtree Hundred.

References

Villages in Worcestershire